The International Skating Union organises the following World Championships in the sport of speed skating:

Records

World Allround

Men

Source: SpeedSkatingStats.com

Women

Source: SpeedSkatingStats.com

Junior
 Multiple champions (overall classification)
 Boys

 Girls

World Sprint

Men

Source: SpeedSkatingStats.com

Women

Source: SpeedSkatingStats.com

World Single Distances

Men

Source: SpeedSkatingStats.com

Women

Source: SpeedSkatingStats.com

World Short Track (Overall)

Men

Women

Combined all-time medal count 
Updated after the 2023 World Single Distances Speed Skating Championships.

This table include all medals won at the World Allround Speed Skating Championships (1889–2022), World Sprint Speed Skating Championships (1970–2022) and World Single Distances Speed Skating Championships (1996–2023). Unofficial World Championships (not recognized by the ISU) also included

References